Poljane is a dispersed settlement in the hills northwest of Rečica ob Savinji in Slovenia. The area belongs to the traditional Styria region and is now included in the Savinja Statistical Region.

Rudenek Castle, also known locally as Lekše Castle, was a 14th-century castle in the eastern part of the settlement. It was expanded in the Renaissance but abandoned and destroyed in the 18th century. Some of the enclosing walls are still visible, and two stories of one of the original towers survives.

References

External links
Poljane on Geopedia

Populated places in the Municipality of Rečica ob Savinji